The Courtier Islands are a group of about 24 small islands and rocks in Marguerite Bay, the highest reaching , lying close southwest of Emperor Island in the Dion Islands. The Dion Islands were first sighted and roughly mapped in 1909 by the French Antarctic Expedition. The Courtier Islands were visited and surveyed in 1949 by the Falkland Islands Dependencies Survey and so named by the UK Antarctic Place-Names Committee because of their association with Emperor Island.

See also 
 List of Antarctic and sub-Antarctic islands

References
 

Islands of Graham Land
Fallières Coast